Grad or grads may refer to:

Places
 Grad (toponymy) (Cyrillic: Град) is a Slavic word meaning "town", "city", "castle" or "fortified settlement" that appears in numerous Slavic toponyms

Specific places named Grad
 Grad, Visoko, Bosnia and Herzegovina
 Grad, Delčevo, North Macedonia
 Grąd, Podlaskie Voivodeship, Poland
 Grąd, West Pomeranian Voivodeship, Poland
 Grad, Cerklje na Gorenjskem, Slovenia
 Municipality of Grad, Slovenia
 Grad, Grad, a village, the seat of the municipality

People
 Grad (surname)

Arts, entertainment, and media 
 Grad (EP), a Cactus Jack EP
 Grad, the dragon in Ral Grad

Education
Grad, short for a graduate, one who has graduated from an education program, also known as an alumnus
Grad school, short for graduate school

Geometry and measurement 
 Gradian, a unit of angular measurement
 Gradient of a scalar field, a differential operator in mathematics
 Grad, a small unit in tuning very close to the schisma, which it is also called

Other uses
 BM-21 Grad, a Soviet multiple-launch rocket system and an associated series of  artillery rockets
 Grad Associates, an architectural firm based in Newark, New Jersey
 GrADS, a free software for geophysical data visualization